Georg Christoph Grooth (January 21, 1716, in Stuttgart – October 9, 1749, in St. Petersburg) was a German painter employed at the Duchy of Württemberg before moving to Imperial Russia to paint portraits of Elizabeth of Russia and Peter III of Russia.

References 

1716 births
1749 deaths
German painters
German emigrants to Russia